The 1922–23 NHL season was the sixth season of the National Hockey League. Four teams played 24 games each. The Ottawa Senators defeated the Montreal Canadiens for the NHL championship, and then defeated Vancouver and Edmonton to win the Stanley Cup.

Regular season
At the start of the season, Newsy Lalonde found himself moving west as the Montreal Canadiens traded him to the Saskatoon Sheiks of the Western Canada Hockey League for a rising young star named Aurel Joliat. Joliat would help the Canadiens win the second playoff spot over the St. Patricks. Joliat scored two goals in his first game with the Canadiens, but Babe Dye had five goals in the Toronto St. Patricks' 7–2 win. Joliat finished with 12 goals and 21 points in 24 games.

On January 31, 1923, the Montreal Canadiens and Hamilton Tigers played the first penalty-free game in NHL history, a 5–4 Montreal victory.

On February 14, 1923, CFCA, the radio station of the Toronto Daily Star, broadcast the third period of the Senators-St. Patricks game in Toronto. This was the first radio broadcast of an NHL game. The broadcaster has not been identified, but it may have been Norman Albert who broadcast the Midland-North Toronto game February 8 from the Toronto Arena.

On February 17, 1923, Cy Denneny of Ottawa scored his 143rd goal, surpassing Joe Malone as the all-time goal-scoring leader as the Ottawa Senators shut out the Montreal Canadiens 2–0.

Standings

Playoffs
This was the second year in which the Stanley Cup playoffs involved three leagues. The previous year saw all three second place teams win their respective leagues. This year, it was all the first place teams. The NHL total goals playoffs for the O'Brien Cup were won by the Ottawa Senators 3 goals to 2, despite the dirty play of several Montreal Canadiens players.  The Pacific Coast Hockey Association abandoned its seven-man hockey in favour of the six-man rules used in the NHL and the Western Canada Hockey League. This allowed the PCHA and the WCHL to play interleague games. Despite playing interleague games, the two separate leagues kept their own standings. The newly renamed Vancouver Maroons won the PCHA championship and the Edmonton Eskimos won the WCHL championship.

NHL Championship

Stanley Cup playoffs

The Stanley Cup playoffs were played in Vancouver. There, the WCHL champions received the privilege of battling the winner between Ottawa and Vancouver. In the end, Ottawa prevailed over both Western opponents to win their eighth Stanley Cup (third as a member of the NHL). Injuries had thinned the Senators line-up, and after seeing the gritty show put on by the undermanned Senators, Vancouver head coach Frank Patrick called them the greatest team he had ever seen.

Stanley Cup Finals

NHL Playoff scoring leader
Note: GP = Games played; G = Goals; A = Assists; Pts = Points

Awards
O'Brien Cup — Ottawa Senators

Player statistics

Scoring leaders
Note: GP = Games played; G = Goals; A = Assists; PIM = Penalties in minutes; Pts = Points
Source: NHL

Leading goaltenders
GP = Games Played, GA = Goals Against, Mins = Minutes played, SO = Shutouts, GAA = Goals Against Average
Source: NHL

Coaches
Hamilton Tigers: Art Ross
Montreal Canadiens: Leo Dandurand
Ottawa Senators: Pete Green
Toronto St. Patricks: George O'Donoghue

Debuts
The following is a list of players of note who played their first NHL game in 1922–23 (listed with their first team, asterisk(*) marks debut in playoffs):
Billy Burch, Hamilton Tigers
Aurel Joliat, Montreal Canadiens
Lionel Hitchman, Ottawa Senators

Last games
The following is a list of players of note that played their last game in the NHL in 1922–23 (listed with their last team):
Didier Pitre, Montreal Canadiens
Eddie Gerard, Ottawa Senators
Harry Cameron, Toronto St. Patricks

Free agency

Transactions

See also
List of Stanley Cup champions
Pacific Coast Hockey Association
Western Canada Hockey League
List of pre-NHL seasons
1922 in sports
1923 in sports

References
 
 
 
 
 
 
 

Notes

External links
 
 NHL.com

 
NHL